The 1950 Copa Ibarguren was the 20th. edition of this national cup of Argentina. Since this edition, the cup was contested by the winners of Primera División and Copa Presidente de la Nación (a competition formed by teams from regional leagues).

The final was contested by Racing Club de Avellaneda (1950 Primera División champion), and Liga Mendocina de Fútbol ("Mendoza League"), champion of 1950 Copa Presidente de la Nación.

Liga Mendoza beat Racing (which played a Copa Ibarguren after 32 years since their last participation) 3–2, winning their first national title.

Qualified teams

Overview 

The Liga Mendocina team had had a good performance in the 1950 Copa Presidente de la Nación, thrashing Misiones 6–1 in their debut. In quarter final, they easily defeated Buenos Aires (4–0) to reach the semifinal where they had to play an extra time after the match ended 2–2 in regular time. As the match continued equaled after the extension, Liga Mendocina qualified to the final by 15–3 on corner kicks awarded, a curious rule that was also used in Copa Adrián C. Escobar. In the final at Gimmnasia y Esgrima Stadium in Mendoza capital city, Liga Mendocina beat Córdoba 2–1.

On the other hand, Racing Club, coached by Guillermo Stábile, had won the Primera División title in the last two seasons, 1949 and 1950. The great moment of the club included the inauguration of a modern stadium, Estadio Presidente Perón, that same year. It replaced the old Racing Stadium closed in 1947.

Match details

References 

i
1950 in Argentine football
1950 in South American football